Events from the year 1810 in Scotland.

Incumbents

Law officers 
 Lord Advocate – Archibald Colquhoun
 Solicitor General for Scotland – David Boyle

Judiciary 
 Lord President of the Court of Session – Lord Avontoun
 Lord Justice General – The Duke of Montrose
 Lord Justice Clerk – Lord Granton

Events 
 25 March – the Commercial Bank of Scotland is founded in Edinburgh by John Pitcairn, Lord Cockburn and others.
 10 May – Rev. Henry Duncan opens the world's first commercial savings bank in Ruthwell, Dumfriesshire.
 10 November – Paisley canal disaster: A pleasure craft capsizes on the newly-completed first section of the Glasgow, Paisley and Johnstone Canal with the loss of 84 lives.
 Monach Islands abandoned for the first time, due to overgrazing.
 Edinburgh Theological College founded to train clergy for the Scottish Episcopal Church.

Births 
 5 February – John Muir, Indologist (died 1882)
 2 April – Thomas Balfour, politician (died 1838)
 19 June – Charles Wilson, architect (died 1863)
 August – William Miller, poet (died 1872)
 19 August – Edward Ellice, Liberal politician (died 1880)
 22 September – John Brown, physician and essayist (died 1882)
 12 October – Alexander Bain, inventor (died 1877)
 8 December – John Strain, first Roman Catholic Archbishop of St Andrews and Edinburgh (died 1883)
 Andrew Findlater, editor (died 1885)
 John Notman, architect in the United States (died 1865)

Deaths 
 17 May – Robert Tannahill, "weaver poet"  (born 1774)
 John Finlay, poet (born 1782)
 Probable date – William Cruickshank, military surgeon, chemist and inventor

The arts
 Jane Porter's historical novel about William Wallace, The Scottish Chiefs, is published.
 Walter Scott's narrative poem The Lady of the Lake is published.

See also 
 1810 in the United Kingdom

References 

 
Years of the 19th century in Scotland
1810s in Scotland